Hriday Narayan Dikshit is an Indian politician and the former speaker of Uttar Pradesh Legislative Assembly. He was member of Ninth, Tenth, Eleventh, Twelfth and Seventeenth Vidhan Sabha currently representing Bhagwantnagar (Assembly constituency) of Unnao district.

Career

Hriday Narayan Dixit has become an MLA from Bhagwantnagar in Unnao district. He defeated BSP's Shashank Shekhar Singh by 53,366 votes.

Hriday Narayan Dixit is from Louva village of Purva tehsil in Unnao. He became an MLA in 1985 after contesting as an Independent. After this, in 1989, he became an MLA on a Janata Dal ticket. When he left the Janata Dal, he held on to the SP and in 1993 he was elected MLA for the third time after contesting the elections. In 1995, when the SP-BSP coalition government was there, he was the Minister of Parliamentary Affairs and the Minister of Panchayati Raj. After this, he was also a BJP Legislative Council member and party leader from 2010 to 2016. This time he won the Bhagwantnagar seat on a BJP ticket and became an MLA for the fourth time.

Emergency was imposed in the country from 26 June 1975 to 21 March 1977. During this time many leaders were put in jail. Then Hriday Narayan Dixit also went to jail. He was imprisoned for 19 months.

Hriday Narayan Dixit is also a writer. His articles have also been published in newspapers.

Other works 
Dixit also works as a journalist. His columns are in highly appreciated. He is an author and has authored several books. His chief literary works are "Madhu Abhilasha","Deen Dayal Upadhyay: Drashta,Drishti aur Darshan" and "Hind Swaraj ka Punarpaath". 

References

People from Unnao
Bharatiya Janata Party politicians from Uttar Pradesh
Members of the Uttar Pradesh Legislative Council
Uttar Pradesh MLAs 2017–2022
Living people
Speakers of the Uttar Pradesh Legislative Assembly
1946 births